Athamas is a genus of jumping spiders that was first described by Octavius Pickard-Cambridge in 1877. The name is derived from Athamas, the king of Orchomenus in Greek mythology.

Species
 it contains seven species, found on Vanuatu, Palau, in Papua New Guinea, on the Polynesian Islands, and Tahiti:
Athamas debakkeri Szüts, 2003 – Papua New Guinea (New Ireland)
Athamas guineensis Jendrzejewska, 1995 – New Guinea
Athamas kochi Jendrzejewska, 1995 – Tahiti
Athamas nitidus Jendrzejewska, 1995 – New Guinea
Athamas proszynskii Ono, 2011 – Palau Is.
Athamas tahitensis Jendrzejewska, 1995 – French Polynesia (Society Is.: Tahiti)
Athamas whitmeei O. Pickard-Cambridge, 1877 (type) – Vanuatu, Polynesia

References

Further reading

Salticidae genera
Salticidae
Spiders of Oceania
Taxa named by Octavius Pickard-Cambridge